is a Japanese footballer who plays as center-back or defensive midfielder for Bundesliga club Borussia Mönchengladbach and the Japan national team.

Club career
Born in Yokohama, Ko Itakura joined J1 League club Kawasaki Frontale in 2015, with which he won the 2017 Japanese championship.

He was loaned to Vegalta Sendai in 2018.

In January 2019, he joined Premier League club Manchester City and was immediately loaned to Eredivisie club Groningen, until the summer of 2020. On 24 July 2020, his stay with Groningen was extended with one more year after both clubs agreed.

On 19 August 2021, Itakura signed a season-long loan deal with 2. Bundesliga club Schalke 04 with an option to make the move permanent for £5 million. At the end of the season, he was promoted to the Bundesliga with Schalke, but the club did not activate the option due to financial reasons.

On 2 July 2022, he returned to Germany and signed permanently with Bundesliga club Borussia Mönchengladbach on a €5,000,000 transfer fee.

International career
In May 2017, Itakura was called up to the Japan U-20 national team for the 2017 U-20 World Cup. At this tournament, he played 2 matches as defensive midfielder.

He was selected for the senior Japan national football team for 2019 Copa América and made his debut on 20 June 2019 in the game against Uruguay, as a starter.

In November 2022, he was selected for the 2022 FIFA World Cup Japan National team for the first time. Participated in all group stage matches and became the first Asian team to win first place in an overseas World Cup group league, contributing to advance to the final tournament for two consecutive tournaments. His long ball was the starting point of the come-from-behind goal against Germany. He was also named in the first group stage best eleven by Spain's 'Marca' and Italy's version of 'Sky Sports'. The former named him one of the players to double his value in the World Cup and described him as "the most consistent performance of the entire tournament".

Career statistics

Club

International

Scores and results list Japan's goal tally first.

Honours
Kawasaki Frontale
J1 League: 2017
Vegalta Sendai
Emperor's Cup: 2018

Schalke 04
2. Bundesliga: 2021–22

Individual
 TAG Heuer YOUNG GUNS AWARD: 2018
 Groningen player of the year: 2020/21 

 Japan Pro-Footballers Association awards: Best XI (2022)

References

External links

Profile at Vegalta Sendai
Profile at Kawasaki Frontale

1997 births
Living people
Association football people from Kanagawa Prefecture
Japanese footballers
Japan youth international footballers
Japan under-20 international footballers
Japan international footballers
J1 League players
J3 League players
Eredivisie players
Bundesliga players
2. Bundesliga players
Kawasaki Frontale players
J.League U-22 Selection players
Vegalta Sendai players
Manchester City F.C. players
FC Groningen players
FC Schalke 04 players
Borussia Mönchengladbach players
Association football defenders
Footballers at the 2018 Asian Games
Asian Games silver medalists for Japan
Asian Games medalists in football
Medalists at the 2018 Asian Games
2019 Copa América players
2022 FIFA World Cup players
Footballers at the 2020 Summer Olympics
Olympic footballers of Japan